Eight vessels of the Royal Navy have been named HMS Acheron after Acheron, a river of Hades in Greek mythology.

  was an 8-gun bomb vessel purchased in 1803 and captured and burnt by the  French frigates  and  near Gibraltar on 4 February 1805.
  was a wood paddle sloop launched in 1838 and sold in 1855.
 HMS Acheron was to have been a screw sloop. She was laid down in 1861 but she was cancelled in 1863 before her launch.
  was an ironclad frigate launched in 1866. She became a base ship in 1898 and was renamed HMS Acheron in 1904. She was hulked as C8 in 1908, renamed C68 in 1926, was sold in 1927, and resold as the hulk Stedmound.
  was a torpedo boat launched in 1879 and sold in 1902.
  was an  destroyer launched in 1911 and sold in 1921.
  was an  destroyer launched in 1930 and sunk by a mine off the Isle of Wight in 1940.
  was an  diesel-electric submarine launched in 1947 and scrapped in 1972.

References

Royal Navy ship names